Cédric Sorhaindo (born 7 June 1984) is a French handball player for Dinamo București and the French national team.

He won with the France national team gold medals at the 2012 Summer Olympics, the 2009 World Men's Handball Championship in Croatia and the 2015 World Handball Championships in Qatar. Sorhaindo is playing in FC Barcelona, where he won 3 EHF Champions League titles and 11 Liga ASOBAL.

References

External links

French male handball players
1984 births
Living people
Martiniquais handball players
French people of Martiniquais descent
Liga ASOBAL players
Handball players at the 2012 Summer Olympics
Handball players at the 2016 Summer Olympics
Olympic handball players of France
Olympic gold medalists for France
Olympic silver medalists for France
Olympic medalists in handball
Medalists at the 2012 Summer Olympics
Medalists at the 2016 Summer Olympics
European champions for France
Expatriate handball players
French expatriate sportspeople in Spain
French expatriate sportspeople in Romania
FC Barcelona Handbol players
CS Dinamo București (men's handball) players
People from La Trinité, Martinique